The Holy Transfiguration of Our Lord Chapel is a historic Russian Orthodox church located near Ninilchik, Kenai Peninsula Borough, Alaska, that was built in 1901. It is an approximately  roughly cruxiform-shaped building, mainly designed by Alexi Andreev Oskolkoff who came from Sitka to supervise the building's construction.  The 1901 church replaced an older church built near Ninilchik village's 1846 founding.  As of 1977, the church competed only with a largely altered schoolhouse as an artifact of past Russian associations to the community.

It was listed on the National Register of Historic Places in 1978.

Now it is under Diocese of Alaska of the Orthodox Church in America.

See also
National Register of Historic Places listings in Kenai Peninsula Borough, Alaska

References

External links

20th-century Eastern Orthodox church buildings
Buildings and structures in Kenai Peninsula Borough, Alaska
Churches on the National Register of Historic Places in Alaska
Churches completed in 1901
Russian Orthodox church buildings in Alaska
Tourist attractions in Kenai Peninsula Borough, Alaska
Historic American Buildings Survey in Alaska
Buildings and structures on the National Register of Historic Places in Kenai Peninsula Borough, Alaska